Weidner is a German surname. Notable people with the surname include:

 Brant Weidner (born 1960), American basketball player
 Gabrielle Weidner (1914–1945), Dutch World War II heroine
 Johan Hendrik Weidner (1912–1994), Dutch World War II resistance fighter
 Stephan Weidner (born 1963), head of the German hard-rock band Böhse Onkelz

German toponymic surnames

German-language surnames
Occupational surnames